Twardzik is a surname. Notable people with the surname include:
 Dan Twardzik (born 1991), Czech footballer
 Dave Twardzik (born 1950), American basketball player
 Dick Twardzik (1931–1955), American jazz pianist
 Filip Twardzik (born 1993), Czech footballer
 Patrik Twardzik (born 1993), Czech footballer
 René Twardzik (born 1970), Czech footballer
 Ted Twardzik, Mrs. T's Pierogies founder

See also
 

Polish-language surnames